2554 Skiff, provisional designation , is a Florian asteroid from the inner regions of the asteroid belt, approximately  in diameter. It was discovered on 17 July 1980, by American astronomer Edward Bowell at Lowell's Anderson Mesa Station near Flagstaff, Arizona. The presumed S-type asteroid has a rotation period of 25.6 hours and was named after astronomer Brian Skiff.

Orbit and classification 

Skiff is a member of the Flora family, a giant asteroid family and the largest family of stony asteroids in the main-belt. Based on an alternative HCM-classification, the Asteroid Dynamic Site groups this asteroid to the core members of the Levin family, a proposed Florian subfamily of 1145 bodies which is named after its parent body 2076 Levin.

It orbits the Sun in the inner main-belt at a distance of 1.9–2.6 AU once every 3 years and 5 months (1,244 days; semi-major axis of 2.26 AU). Its orbit has an eccentricity of 0.14 and an inclination of 5° with respect to the ecliptic. The body's observation arc begins with a precovery taken at Palomar Observatory in June 1953, more than 27 years prior to its official discovery observation at Anderson Mesa.

Physical characteristics 

Skiff is an assumed stony S-type asteroid, which is also the overall spectral type of the Flora family.

Rotation period 

In August 2014, a rotational lightcurve of Skiff was obtained from photometric observations by Italian astronomers at the Franco Fuligni Observatory near Rome. It gave a provisional rotation period of  hours with a brightness amplitude of 0.32 in magnitude.

Diameter and albedo 

According to the surveys carried out by the Japanese Akari satellite and the NEOWISE mission of NASA's Wide-field Infrared Survey Explorer, Skiff measures between 6.005 and 8.56 kilometers in diameter and its surface has an albedo between 0.153 and 0.4489.

The Collaborative Asteroid Lightcurve Link assumes an albedo of 0.24 – derived from 8 Flora, the Flora family's parent body – and calculates a diameter of 7.82 kilometers based on an absolute magnitude of 12.7.

Naming 

This minor planet was named in honor of American astronomer Brian Skiff, discoverer more than 50 asteroids. He significantly contributed to Lowell's asteroid astrometry program, including the rediscovery of the 800-meter potentially hazardous object 69230 Hermes, a long-lost asteroid. The official naming citation was published by the Minor Planet Center on 8 April 1982.

References

External links 
 Asteroid Lightcurve Database (LCDB), query form (info )
 Dictionary of Minor Planet Names, Google books
 Asteroids and comets rotation curves, CdR – Observatoire de Genève, Raoul Behrend
 Discovery Circumstances: Numbered Minor Planets (1)-(5000) – Minor Planet Center
 
 

002554
Discoveries by Edward L. G. Bowell
Named minor planets
19800717